Mali Trn is a small village in the Municipality of Krško in eastern Slovenia. The area is part of the traditional region of Lower Carniola. It is now included with the rest of the municipality in the Lower Sava Statistical Region.

The parish church of the Parish of Sveti Duh–Veliki Trn is the local church west of the settlement core. It is dedicated to the Holy Spirit and belongs to the Roman Catholic Diocese of Novo Mesto. It was built in 1885 in a Neo-Gothic style.

References

External links

Mali Trn on Geopedia

Populated places in the Municipality of Krško